The Constanța metropolitan area, is a metropolitan area, established in 2007, that includes the municipality of Constanța, the towns of Năvodari, Ovidiu, Eforie, Murfatlar, Techirghiol and 8 communes: Mihail Kogălniceanu, Cumpăna, Valu lui Traian, Lumina, Tuzla, Agigea, Corbu and Poarta Albă. It has a population of 425,916, in an area consisting of 16% of Constanța County.

As defined by Eurostat, with 420,241 residents, the Constanța functional urban area is the third most populous in Romania.

Such administrative arrangement existed in an approximative similarity before 1989, when Constanța Municipality also included the city of Mangalia and the communes 23 August and Limanu, together with all the summer resorts located between 23 August and Mangalia (the so-called "Mangalia Nord" resorts area).

However this administrative reform exists only on paper, nothing being done so far to put this decision into practice (e.g. unified local administration and transportation).

References

External links
 "Anuarul statistic al județului Constanța" – 1986, Direcția Județeana de Statistică Constanța
 

Geography of Constanța County
Metropolitan areas of Romania